Dittmer may refer to:

People
Andreas Dittmer (born 1972), German sprint canoeist
Anja Dittmer (born 1975), German triathlete
Erica Dittmer (born 1991), American-born Mexican swimmer
Felix Dittmer (1904–1977), Australian politician
Jack Dittmer (1928–2014), American baseball player
John Dittmer (born 1939), American historian
Mads Dittmer Hvilsom (born 1992), Danish footballer

Places
Dittmer, Queensland, a locality in the Whitsunday Region, Queensland, Australia

See also
Dittmar